The following radio stations broadcast on AM frequency 1593 kHz:

Australia 
 SEN Track in Melbourne, Victoria

China 
 CNR The Voice of China

France
Bretagne 5 from Saint-Gouéno transmitter

Italy
"Radio Gold" at Sicily (transmits AM stereo)

Thailand
"Sor. Wor. Thor." at Tambon Don Tako, Mueang Ratchaburi District (transmits AM stereo)

References

Lists of radio stations by frequency